The 2009 Yale Bulldogs football team represented Yale University in the 2009 NCAA Division I FCS football season.  The Bulldogs were led by first-year head coach Tom Williams, played their home games at the Yale Bowl and finished tied for sixth place in the Ivy League with a 2–5 record, 4–6 overall.  Yale averaged 21,245 fans per game.

Schedule

References

Yale
Yale Bulldogs football seasons
Yale Bulldogs football